Lucha Libre Femenil (LLF) is a Lucha Libre (professional wrestling) promotion based in Monterrey, Nuevo León, Mexico. The promotion was founded in 2000 by Luciano Alberto Garcia de Luna, who still owns the company. The matches take place in the Arena Femenil in downtown Monterrey, near the Macroplaza. The arena is frequently shared with other promotions, but it is solely owned by LLF. 

In Lucha Libre Femenil, only matches between female wrestlers are organized. The promotion has helped nurture many young female wrestlers who have gone on to become successful in Mexico's major wrestling promotions such as Lucha Libre AAA Worldwide and the Consejo Mundial de Lucha Libre. Among the well-known wrestlers who have worked in the promotion include Lady Flammer and Lady Maravilla.

Champions
Current champions

References

External links
Official website

Mexican professional wrestling promotions
Mexican companies established in 2000
Organizations established in 2000
Women's professional wrestling promotions